Irene Kampen (April 18, 1922, in Brooklyn, New York – February 1, 1998, in Oceanside, California) was an American newspaperwoman and author who wrote several books about events in her life.

Biography
Born Irene Trepel in Brooklyn, New York, and raised in Great Neck, New York, she graduated from Great Neck High School. Kampen attended the University of Wisconsin–Madison before becoming a copy girl at the newspaper, New York Journal American, in 1943. She soon married Owen Kampen, an active-duty World War II pilot with the United States Army Air Forces. She went on to work at several weekly newspapers, becoming a reporter for the Levittown Tribune when the family moved to Levittown, New York, in 1948.

In 1954, the Kampens moved to a new house in Ridgefield, Connecticut, soon divorcing her husband after a fourteen-year marriage. While working at her father's flower shop in New York City, she wrote fiction stories. She also frequently contributed to the local newspaper, The Ridgefield Press, using the pseudonym, H. Loomis Fenstermacher.

Kampen's first book, Life Without George, was published by Doubleday in 1961 and was about her divorce. The book became the basis for The Lucy Show, a television series that ran from 1962 to 1968 and starred Lucille Ball, who had also experienced divorce, from Desi Arnaz, just a few months before Kampen's book was published. Producers re-wrote Ball's character, Lucille Carmichael, as a widow, but the show portrayed Vivian Vance's character, Vivian Bagley, as a divorcée.

Kampen lived in Connecticut until 1988, when she moved to California. She died February 1, 1998, of breast cancer at the age of 75.

Select bibliography

Kampen's published books include:
 Life Without George
 Are You Carrying Any Gold Or Living Relatives?
 Due to Lack of Interest, Tomorrow Has Been Canceled
 Fear Without Childbirth
 Nobody Calls At This Hour Just To Say Hello
 Here Comes The Bride, There Goes Mother
 Europe Without George
 We That Are Left
 Last Year At Sugarbush

References

External links

 Levittown Tribune Obituary, February 20th, 1998

1922 births
1998 deaths
20th-century American memoirists
People from Ridgefield, Connecticut
20th-century American women writers